The Syracuse Orange women's soccer team represents Syracuse University in the Atlantic Coast Conference (ACC) of NCAA Division I women's college soccer. The team has never won a conference championship. The Orange have played in both the ACC and Big East.  The team has advanced to the NCAA Women's soccer tournament twice.  In both appearances, the Orange won their first-round game, but fell in the second round.

History

1990s
The Syracuse Orange women's soccer program was founded in 1996 with April Kater as the first head coach. The team played outside of a conference in their first season and finished a respectable 10–6–1. In 1997, the Orange joined Big East Conference play, where the university was a full member.  The team finished with a 14–5 overall record and a 6–5 conference record.  14 wins is a tie for the program's most overall wins, with the mark also being reached in 1998 and 2000.  In 1998, the team qualified for its first ever Big East Tournament and its first NCAA Tournament.  The team lost in the second round of both tournaments.  The team also set a program record for 7 conference wins, a record that still stands today.  The decade closed with another post-season appearance in the Big East Tournament.  This time the team lost in the first round.

2000s
The decade started off with a third consecutive Big East Tournament appearance for the Orange, and 14 overall wins.  The Orange would follow up that performance with a second NCAA Tournament appearance in 2001.  However, fortunes would quickly change.  2001 would be the final time the team has qualified for the NCAA Tournament to date.  2002 saw the team win only 3 games, a tie for program worst.  The Orange also did not win a game in conference play.  2003 saw an improvement to 9–8–1, but it was not enough for coach April Kater to continue with the program.  She resigned her post in April 2004. Patrick Farmer was hired as the program's second coach in May 2004.  Farmer's tenure with the team would last 4 seasons.  The Orange would qualify for the Big East Tournament once, in 2005.  However, the team would never have a winning overall or conference season during his tenure.  The team would lose 12 games in back to back seasons from 2005 to 2006.  In January 2008, Farmer would resign to pursue other opportunities. Phil Wheddon was hired as Farmer's replacement in March 2008.  Wheddon's first to seasons saw the team finish 2–8–1 in conference play, and lose 11 games overall.

2010s
The decade started with a slight improvement, with the Orange winning one additional overall and conference game compared to 2009.  2011 continued to build on this improvement, with the team qualifying for the Big East Tournament for the first time since 2005.  In 2012, the Orange had their first overall winning season since 2003 and qualified for the Big East Tournament again.  In 2013, the Orange joined the Atlantic Coast Conference.  Life in the new conference would prove difficult, as the team finished 3–9–1 in conference play.  The team also lost double digit overall games in each season from 2013 to 2015.  2016 was a lone overall bright spot, when the Orange mustered a .500 record, finishing 8–8–3 overall, but only won one game in conference play.  2018 was one of the worst seasons in team history.  The Orange finished 3–15–0 overall, and 0–10 in the conference.  This was the team's second winless conference season and the second time the team has won only 3 overall games.  Wheddon resigned after the season.  Prior to the 2019 season, Nicky Adams was hired as the programs fourth coach.

2020s 
The decade started with a season shortened by the COVID-19 pandemic.  The Orange did not play non-conference matchups and finished the season 1–7–0, in 12th place in the ACC.  In 2021, the Orange returned to a more normal schedule and went 0–10–0 in ACC play and 4–12–1 overall to finish in 14th place in the ACC.  It was the second time in four years the Orange finished winless in conference play.  Their four total wins was a program high for the past four seasons.  The Orange improved on their record in 2022 finishing 8–7–3 overall and 1–6–3 in ACC play.  Their eight total wins were their best since 2016, and this was the first time the team finished above .500 overall since 2012, prior to joining the ACC.  Their six conference points were their most since 2017.

Personnel

Current roster

Team management

Source:

Seasons

^In 1997 Syracuse began play in the Big East Conference.
†In 2013 Syracuse began play in the Atlantic Coast Conference.

Notable alumni

Current Professional Players

  Erin Simon (2012–2015) – currently with Leicester City
  Courtney Brosnan (2014–2017) – currently with Everton
  Alex Lamontagne (2014–2017) – currently with Rodez AF
  Alana O'Neill (2014–2017) – currently with FC Zürich
  Alina Myagkova (2020–2021)  – currently with Lokomotiv Moscow

References

External links
 
 2018 Media Guide

 
Women's soccer clubs in New York (state)
NCAA Division I women's soccer teams
Syracuse Orange